The Franklin Bulls are a New Zealand basketball team based in Pukekohe, Auckland. The Bulls compete in the National Basketball League (NBL) and play their home games at the Franklin Pool and Leisure Centre. For sponsorship reasons, they are known as the EnviroNZ Franklin Bulls.

Team history
In July 2019, the Franklin Bulls were granted provisional entry into the National Basketball League (NBL) for the 2021 season. However, following the withdrawal of the Southern Huskies and Super City Rangers, the Bulls expedited their process to complete a set of requirements set down by the league, and in November 2019, they were granted entry into the NBL for the 2020 season. Their inaugural season in the NBL looked in doubt when the season was suspended due to the COVID-19 pandemic. The league returned in a reduced format based entirely in Auckland, with the Bulls finishing fifth in the regular season with a 7–7 record before losing their elimination final to the Taranaki Mountainairs. Coached by Australian Liam Simmons, the inaugural squad featured Everard Bartlett and Sam Timmins.

Current roster

References

External links
 Official website of Franklin Basketball
 

National Basketball League (New Zealand) teams
Basketball teams in Auckland
Basketball teams established in 2019
2019 establishments in New Zealand